Muno is a given name and surname which may refer to:

 Claudine Muno (born 1979), Luxembourgian author, singer, musician, music teacher, and journalist
 Danny Muno (born 1989), American Major League Baseball player
 Muno, a red cyclops on the children's television show Yo Gabba Gabba!